Jesús Tello (born 28 November 1934) is a Mexican boxer. He competed in the men's flyweight event at the 1952 Summer Olympics. In his first fight, he lost to Leslie Donovan Perera Handunge of Ceylon.

References

1934 births
Living people
Mexican male boxers
Olympic boxers of Mexico
Boxers at the 1952 Summer Olympics
Place of birth missing (living people)
Flyweight boxers